The Pavilion for Japanese Art is a part of the Los Angeles County Museum of Art containing the museum's collection of Japanese works that date from approximately 3000 BC through the 20th century AD. The building itself was designed by renowned architect Bruce Goff.

Collections 
Archaeological artifacts, Buddhist and Shinto sculpture, ceramics, lacquerware, textiles, cloisonné, and armor are on display on the second level of the Pavilion's West Wing. The Helen and Felix Juda Gallery, also on the second level, is primarily reserved for Japanese prints displayed in rotating exhibits. The museum's collection includes traditional woodblock prints from the Edo period (1615–1868), as well as a large number of prints from the Meiji period (1868–1912), Taishō period (1912–1926), and the Shōwa period (1926–1989). Print exhibitions change every three months and are based on periods, themes, or styles.

The exhibition space in the Pavilion's East Wing displays a rotating selection of screens and hanging scrolls from the Edo period, including works from the Rimpa, ukiyo-e, and Maruyama-Shijo schools as well as spontaneous creations made by Zen monks. Works of art are exhibited on six levels within the East Wing.

The plaza level contains the Raymond and Frances Bushell Netsuke Gallery, which holds an encyclopedic array of 827 works from the 17th through the 20th century. This gallery provides visitors with a 360-degree view of the miniature sculptures known as netsuke. In traditional Japan, netsuke were used as toggles and counterweights for suspending tobacco pouches and inro from the sash of men's kimono.

Architecture 
Designed by Bruce Goff, the 32,100-square-foot building is notable for its translucent fiberglass panels, which allow paintings to be lit safely and naturally by soft sunlight. The effect approximates the original viewing conditions for these paintings and allows gold leaf to reflect, creating dimensional levels within works of art not visible under artificial lighting. Japanese screens can be viewed at a distance, while scrolls can be viewed closer in alcove-like settings that suggest the tokonoma viewing area in a Japanese home. The pavilion also features a prow-shaped roof and cylindrical towers. The architectural landscape was designed by the firm of Hannah Olin.

History 
Collector Joe D. Price's Shin'enkan Collection of more than 300 Japanese scroll and screen paintings represents the core of the Los Angeles County Museum of Art's Japanese holdings. In 1983, Price and his wife Etsuko Yoshimochi bequeathed about 300 Japanese screens and scrolls to the museum and donated $5 million in seed money for a building to house them. In 1987, Price also joined LACMA's board of trustees. The museum, in turn, agreed to maintain and exhibit the collection and to raise up to $2 million in additional funds to build the pavilion. The museum actually raised $7.5 million for the project, in addition to the Prices' gift. Before entering the embrace of LACMA, the pavilion was first designed to be built in Bartlesville, Oklahoma, where Price had assembled his extensive collection, and then was later redesigned as a wing of the Metropolitan Museum of Art in New York. Goff's original design was translated into working drawings for LACMA by his former associate, Bart Prince. Price provided $5 million toward the pavilion's construction costs. Total construction costs were $13-million.

The Pavilion for Japanese Art is scheduled for renovation as part of the redesign of the LACMA campus by architect Peter Zumthor.

Photo gallery

References

External links 

Los Angeles County Museum of Art
Asian art museums in California
Museums of Japanese art
Museums of Japanese culture abroad in the United States
Japanese-American culture in Los Angeles
Art museums established in 1988
1988 establishments in California
Art museums and galleries in Los Angeles
Institutions accredited by the American Alliance of Museums
Buildings and structures completed in 1988
1980s architecture in the United States
Bruce Goff buildings
Expressionist architecture
Organic architecture

ca:Museu d'Art del Comtat de Los Angeles
de:Los Angeles County Museum of Art
es:Image:Shuttlecock by Oldenburg-van Bruggen.jpg
fr:Musée d'art du comté de Los Angeles